The Greens–Green Alternative (EV–AV) is a political party based in Catalonia, founded in September 1999 by former members of The Greens–Ecologist Confederation of Catalonia (EV–CEC), after the party had split in March 1998 over the type of relationship to establish with the newly-autonomous Initiative for Catalonia (IC).

In January 2015, EV–AV joined the "Constituent Call" platform promoted by the Popular Unity Candidacy (CUP), though for the 2015 Catalan regional election they gave support to the Junts pel Sí candidacy. Ahead of the 2017 Catalan regional election the party had several of its members integrated within Together for Catalonia (JxCat)'s lists, granting its support to JxCat in subsequent elections as well. On 28 May 2019, party member Josep Puig entered Parliament replacing Josep Rull as a result of the latter's resignation to become a member of the Congress of Deputies.

Electoral performance

Parliament of Catalonia

Cortes Generales

Notes

References

1993 establishments in Spain
Catalan nationalist parties
Green political parties in Spain
Left-wing nationalist parties
Political parties established in 1999
Political parties in Catalonia